Florida House may refer to:
 Florida House of Representatives, one of the two Chambers of the Florida Legislature
 Florida Tropical House, a beach house in Beverly Shores, Indiana.
 Florida House on Capitol Hill, the only state embassy in Washington, D.C.